The men's 1500 metres event at the 2008 World Junior Championships in Athletics was held in Bydgoszcz, Poland, at Zawisza Stadium on 8 and 10 July.

Medalists

Results

Final
10 July

Heats
8 July

Heat 1

Heat 2

Heat 3

Participation
According to an unofficial count, 36 athletes from 25 countries participated in the event.

References

1500 metres
1500 metres at the World Athletics U20 Championships